Bicyclus golo, the golo bush brown, is a butterfly in the family Nymphalidae. It is found in eastern Nigeria, Cameroon, the Republic of the Congo, the Central African Republic, the eastern part of the Democratic Republic of the Congo, Uganda, western Kenya and north-western Tanzania. The habitat consists of dense forests.

References

Elymniini
Butterflies described in 1893
Butterflies of Africa